Irfan Najeeb (born 31 July 1999) is a Singaporean footballer currently playing as a defender for Singapore Premier League club Tampines Rovers FC.

Career

Najeeb started playing football at the age of seven.

Personal life

Irfan is the nephew of Shahril Ishak.

Career statistics

Club

Notes

Honours

International
Singapore U22
 Merlion Cup: 2019

References

Living people
1999 births
Singaporean footballers
Association football defenders
Singapore Premier League players
Tampines Rovers FC players
Young Lions FC players
Competitors at the 2019 Southeast Asian Games
Singapore youth international footballers
Competitors at the 2021 Southeast Asian Games
Southeast Asian Games competitors for Singapore